Earl of Norfolk is a title which has been created several times in the Peerage of England. Created in 1070, the first major dynasty to hold the title was the 12th and 13th century Bigod family, and it then was later held by the Mowbrays, who were also made Dukes of Norfolk. Due to the Bigods' descent in the female line from William Marshal, they inherited the hereditary office of Earl Marshal, still held by the Dukes of Norfolk today. The present title was created in 1644 for Thomas Howard, 18th Earl of Arundel, the heir of the Howard Dukedom of Norfolk which had been forfeit in 1572. Arundel's grandson, the 20th Earl of Arundel and 3rd Earl of Norfolk, was restored to the Dukedom as 5th Duke upon the Restoration in 1660, and the title continues to be borne by the Dukes of Norfolk.

Earls of Norfolk (and Suffolk), first creation (1066/67)
Ralph the Staller, 1st Earl of Norfolk and Suffolk (c. 1011–1068)
Ralph de Guader, 2nd Earl of Norfolk and Suffolk (c. 1040c. 1096) (forfeit 1074)

Earls of Norfolk, second creation (1141)
Hugh Bigod, 1st Earl of Norfolk (1095–1177)
Roger Bigod, 2nd Earl of Norfolk (died 1221)
Hugh Bigod, 3rd Earl of Norfolk (died 1225)
Roger Bigod, 4th Earl of Norfolk (died 1270)
Roger Bigod, 5th Earl of Norfolk (died 1306)

Earls of Norfolk, third creation (1312)
Thomas of Brotherton, 1st Earl of Norfolk (died 1338)
Margaret, Duchess of Norfolk, 2nd Countess of Norfolk (died 1399)
Thomas de Mowbray, 1st Duke of Norfolk, 3rd Earl of Norfolk (1365–1399) (dukedom forfeit 1399)
Thomas de Mowbray, 4th Earl of Norfolk (1385–1405)
John de Mowbray, 2nd Duke of Norfolk (1392–1432) (dukedom restored 1425)
John de Mowbray, 3rd Duke of Norfolk (1415–1461)
John de Mowbray, 4th Duke of Norfolk (1444–1476) (dukedom abeyant 1476)
Anne de Mowbray, 8th Countess of Norfolk (1472–1481)

Earls of Norfolk, fourth creation (1477)
Richard, Duke of York (1473–1483)

Earls of Norfolk, fifth creation (1644)
 Thomas Howard, 1st Earl of Norfolk (1585–1646)
 Henry Frederick Howard, 2nd Earl of Norfolk (1608–1652)
 Thomas Howard, 5th Duke of Norfolk (dukedom restored 1660)

For later Earls of Norfolk, see Duke of Norfolk.

Family tree

References
 

Earldoms in the Peerage of England
Extinct earldoms in the Peerage of England
Noble titles created in 1070
Noble titles created in 1141
Noble titles created in 1312
Noble titles created in 1477
Noble titles created in 1644

Forfeited earldoms in the Peerage of England